Dolgy is a rural locality (a khutor) in Okladnenskoye Rural Settlement, Uryupinsky District, Volgograd Oblast, Russia. The population was 560 as of 2010. There are 8 streets.

Geography 
Dolgy is located in steppe, 36 km southeast of Uryupinsk (the district's administrative centre) by road. Zelyony is the nearest rural locality.

References 

Rural localities in Uryupinsky District